Shikarpur is Bengali Crime thriller streaming television series starring Ankush Hazra, Kaushik Ganguly and Sandipta Sen. Kaushik Ganguly is also the creative presenter of this series. The series is directed by Nirjhar Mitra.
It is premiered on ZEE5 on 6 January 2023.

Plot 
The story is about Keshto played by Ankush Hazra, a photographer who aspires to be a detective like his guru Dindayal Biswas played by Kaushik Ganguly. Set in a sleepy town in north Bengal, the series sees Keshto trying to solve a series of murders that are rumored to have been caused by a ghost. The web series ended on an emotional note, and featured several touching relationships, including the bond between a father and daughter, played by Kaushik Ganguly and Sandipta Sen and the strained relationship between Kesto and Biman, played by Debasish Mondal.

Cast 
Ankush Hazra as Keshto: A photographer who wants to be a famous detective.
Kaushik Ganguly as Dindayal Biswas: Chumki's father; Former detective of Shikarpur; Keshto's Ustaad.
Sandipta Sen as Chumki Biswas: Keshto's love interest; Dindayal's daughter.
Debasish Mondol as Biman Majhi: A police officer.
Korak Samanta as Boltu Barman: Keshto's assistant.
Sayan Ghosh as David Mayajal: A magician.
Debesh Roy Chowdhury as Ramprakash Ghosh.
Dola Chakraborty as Chumki's mother; Dindayal's wife.
Krishnendu Dewanji as Manik Ghosh.

Production 
Shikarpur went into production in early 2022. It was announced as a part of ZEE5's future content slate in May 2022.

Marketing 
The trailer of Shikarpur was released on December 22, 2022.

Reception 
The Times Of India in its review said, "This series is a promising beginning to what looks like a multi-season series," and rated it 3.5 out of 5.</ref> Binged.com rated the series 6/10, liking the overall story of the series and the premise. OTTPlay in its review complimented the acting of Ganguly and Mondal.

References

External links 
 
 Shikarpur Trailer on YouTube
 Shikarpur on ZEE5

2023 Indian television series debuts
Crime thriller web series
Indian crime television series
Indian web series
ZEE5 original programming